Granada Creek is a stream in the U.S. state of Colorado.

Granada is a name derived from Spanish meaning "end of the road".

See also
List of rivers of Colorado

References

Rivers of Prowers County, Colorado
Rivers of Colorado